Phaitoon Phonbun (born 5 October 1975) is a Thai former professional snooker player.

Career

Phonbun was born in 1975, and began playing snooker at competitive level as a wildcard entry in the 1995 Thailand Open, where he also recorded his first win, a 5–2 defeat of Anthony Davies. He exited the tournament in the next round, 1–5 to the six-time World Champion Steve Davis.

Turning professional in 1998, Phonbun reached the last 48 at that season's China International, recording victories over Joe Delaney, Jason Prince and Darryn Walker before losing 2–5 to Chris Small, and the last 64 at the Welsh Open, where Alain Robidoux defeated him 5–4.

The following season heralded two more last-64 finishes, the most notable being at the 1999 UK Championship, where Phonbun faced Paul Hunter and lost 6–9. In his match against Stephen Maguire at the 2000 Scottish Open, Phonbun beat Maguire 5–4 despite the latter having compiled a maximum 147 break.

Ranked 70th, a career best, for the 2000/2001 season, Phonbun next reached the last-32 stage of a ranking event at the 2001 LG Cup. There, his opponents included Kurt Maflin, Nick Dyson, Terry Murphy and Michael Judge, but Graeme Dott eliminated him 5–1.

The LG Cup performance brought Phonbun £7,800, his highest earning from a single event, but the following season was barren, and having fallen to 103rd in the rankings, he lost his professional status at its conclusion, aged 27.

After twelve years out of the competitive game, Phonbun participated in the 2015 Six-red World Championship in Thailand, qualifying from his group with wins over Ben Judge and Ehsan Heydarinezhad but being eliminated in the last 32 by Anthony McGill, who beat him 6–4. He was also invited to play in the 2016 edition of the tournament, but despite victories over Ryan Thomerson and Dominic Dale, defeats to Ding Junhui, Pankaj Advani and Robert Milkins saw him exit at the group stage.

Career finals

Pro-am finals: 2 (1 title)

Amateur finals: 2 (1 title)

References

Phaitoon Phonbun
1975 births
Living people
Asian Games medalists in cue sports
Cue sports players at the 1998 Asian Games
Cue sports players at the 2006 Asian Games
Phaitoon Phonbun
Phaitoon Phonbun
Medalists at the 1998 Asian Games
Medalists at the 2006 Asian Games
Phaitoon Phonbun
Phaitoon Phonbun
Southeast Asian Games medalists in cue sports
Competitors at the 2007 Southeast Asian Games
Competitors at the 2017 Southeast Asian Games